Rafael Méndez (1904 – 1982)  was a Bolivian footballer who played as a forward.

International career 
During his international career, he made two appearances for the Bolivia national team at the 1930 FIFA World Cup.

References

External links

1904 births
1982 deaths
Footballers from La Paz
Association football forwards
Bolivian footballers
Bolivia international footballers
1930 FIFA World Cup players